The Battle of Chojnice may refer to:

 Battle of Chojnice (1454)
 Battle of Chojnice (1656)
 Battle of Chojnice (1939)